Kpendjal is a prefecture located in the Savanes Region of Togo. The prefecture seat is located in Mandouri. The cantons (or subdivisions) of Kpendjal include Mandouri, Namondjoga, Pogno, Koundjoaré, Naki-Est, Borgou, Ogaro, Tambigou, Nayéga, Papri, and Tambonga.

References 

Prefectures of Togo
Savanes Region, Togo